Willy Demeyer (born 17 March 1959) is a Belgian politician. He is the mayor of Liège since 1999 and has served as the Vice-President of the Socialist Party since 6 December 2011. He also served as a deputy in the Chamber of Representatives for the Socialist Party between June 2014 and September 2017.

Honours 
 2005: Knight of the Legion of Honour
 2014: Officer of the Legion of Honour

References 

1959 births
Living people
Mayors of places in Belgium
People from Liège
Socialist Party (Belgium) politicians
21st-century Belgian politicians